Coop Norden was a Scandinavian retail chain. It was based in Sweden and owned by three major cooperative retail companies: Sweden's KF (42%), Denmark's FDB (38%), and Norway's Coop NKL (20%). During its years of operation, Coop Norden ran around 1,000 stores and had yearly turnover of approximately SEK 90 billion. In 2007, the parent companies decided to dissolve the arrangement and, in January 2008, operation and ownership of the retail chains were returned to the national cooperatives.

Former chains

Sweden
Coop Forum 
Coop Bygg — hardware store
Coop Konsum 
Coop Extra — discount store
Coop Nära 

Denmark
Brugsen — grocery store
SuperBrugsen — supermarket
Dagli'Brugsen — grocery store
LokalBrugsen — small grocery store
Irma — high-end grocery store
Kvickly — supermarket
Kvickly xtra — hypermarket
Fakta — discount store

Greenland
Brugseni (KNB)

Norway
Coop Byggmix — hardware store
Coop Elektro — electrical article store
Coop Extra — convenience store
Coop Kjøkken og Hjem — kitchen and interior store
Coop Marked — grocery store
Coop Mega — supermarket
Coop Obs! — hypermarket
Coop Obs! Bygg — hardware
Coop Prix — discount store
Coop Sport — sport store

Notes

 
Defunct companies of Sweden
Defunct companies of Denmark
Defunct companies of Greenland
Defunct companies of Norway
Retail companies established in 1918
Retail companies disestablished in 2008
Cooperatives in Denmark
Cooperatives in Sweden
Cooperatives in Norway